The following is an episode list for the SVT television series Rederiet.

Series overview

Episodes

Season 1

Season 2

Season 3

Season 4

Season 5

Season 6

Season 7

Season 8

Season 9

Season 10

Season 11

Season 12

Season 13

Season 14

Season 15

Season 16

Note: Four days after the end of season 16, Gösta Prüzelius died. But his character Reidar Dahlén appeared in season 17 as well, because SVT had had time to record it before Gösta's death.

Season 17

Season 18

Season 19

Season 20

References

Rederiet
Rederiet